Yuelai Station is an interchange station between Line 10 and International Expo Branch of Line 6 of Chongqing Rail Transit in Chongqing municipality, China. It is located in Yubei District, adjacent to Chongqing International Expo Center and opened in 2013 with the opening of Line 6 International Expo Branch. It had also served as the northern terminus of Line 6 International Expo Branch until Phase II opened in 2020.

Station structure

References

Railway stations in Chongqing
Railway stations in China opened in 2013
Chongqing Rail Transit stations